"Longview" is the debut single by American rock band Green Day. It is the fourth track on the band's third studio album, Dookie (1994), and was released on February 1, 1994, the same day as the album. The song was the band's first single to top the Billboard Modern Rock Tracks chart in the U.S. The music video for this song received heavy airplay on MTV and is largely credited for breaking Green Day into mainstream popularity. The video was directed by the Bay Area music video director Mark Kohr who collaborated with the band on many music videos.

In 1995, Green Day received four Grammy Award nominations, including Best Hard Rock Performance for "Longview". The song was ranked at number three on the list of the "Best Singles of 1994" by Rolling Stone.

Concept
The song describes intense boredom and frustration with an inability to self-actualize. Lyrically, the song is about a day spent sitting around the house, doing absolutely nothing of importance and masturbating until the days are no longer fun.  Bassist Mike Dirnt has stated that the famous bass line intro to this song was written one night while he was high on LSD.

The song is named after the city of Longview, Washington.

Reception
PopMatters listed "Longview" as the seventh best Green Day song, citing "This song didn’t become an instant classic of its genre merely because Armstrong said the word "masturbation" on the radio—it's all in the delivery." Entertainment Weekly placed it among their favorite Green Day songs.

Music video
"Longview" has a music video, which is the first one created by Green Day. The music video was directed by Mark Kohr, the cinematography was by Adam Beckman, and the editing was by Bob Sarles. The music video received frequent airplay on MTV upon release.

The music video takes place in a dimly-lit basement of a broken-down house in Oakland, California, where the band used to live. The band members say that the look was intentionally grungy. In the video, Billie sits on a couch and watches television. At the end of the music video, he goes insane and tears up the couch, with feathers flying everywhere.

The music video was nominated for three MTV Video Music Awards in 1994: Best Group Video, Best Alternative Video, and Best New Artist. The video is also included on the DVD International Supervideos!.

Track listings
First pressing
 "Longview" – 3:59
 "Going to Pasalacqua" (live) – 4:12
 "F.O.D." (live) – 2:44
 "Christie Road" (live) – 3:49

1995 re-issue
 "Longview" – 3:59
 "Welcome to Paradise" (live) — 4:05
 "One of My Lies" (live) — 2:25

Card sleeve
 "Longview" – 3:59
 "On the Wagon" – 2:48
 "F.O.D." (live) – 2:44
 All live tracks were recorded on March 11, 1994, at Jannus Landing, St. Petersburg, Florida.

7-inch vinyl box set
 "Longview" — 3:59
 "Welcome to Paradise" — 3:45
 "Coming Clean" — 1:35
 "Chump" (live from Stockholm, Sweden; Same version on Live Tracks) — 02:39

Personnel
 Lead vocals and guitar: Billie Joe Armstrong
 Backing vocals and bass: Mike Dirnt
 Drums: Tré Cool
 Songwriting: Billie Joe Armstrong, Mike Dirnt, Tré Cool
 Production: Rob Cavallo, Green Day

Charts

Release history

References

1994 debut singles
1994 songs
Green Day songs
Song recordings produced by Rob Cavallo
Songs about cannabis
Masturbation in fiction
Songs about Washington (state)
Songs written by Billie Joe Armstrong
Songs written by Mike Dirnt
Songs written by Tré Cool
Reprise Records singles
Warner Music Group singles